John Stafford (born 1944) is an Irish former Fianna Fáil politician. He was first elected to Dáil Éireann as a Teachta Dála (TD) for the Dublin Central constituency at the 1987 general election. He was re-elected there at the 1989 general election, but owing to the 1992 boundary revisions he was unable to gain nomination there for Fianna Fáil in that year's general election. Instead he was selected to stand in Dublin North-Central, where he was unsuccessful.

A member of Dublin City Council, Stafford was Lord Mayor of Dublin from 1997 to 1998, and later proposed the motion which led to the council supporting the construction of the Spire of Dublin. The spire was opposed by his brother, Councillor Tom Stafford.

References

 

Fianna Fáil TDs
1944 births
Living people
Members of the 25th Dáil
Members of the 26th Dáil
Lord Mayors of Dublin